Howmeh Rural District is a rural district (dehestan) in the Central District of Haftkel County, Khuzestan Province, Iran. At the 2006 census, its population was 2,546, in 510 families.  The rural district has 19 villages.

References 

Rural Districts of Khuzestan Province
Haftkel County